Upper Falls may be:

Waterfalls
United States
Upper Yellowstone Falls on the Yellowstone River, Yellowstone National Park, Wyoming
Upper Falls — a waterfall in Uvas Canyon County Park, California
 Upper Falls in Waterfalls of Montana

Communities
United States
Upper Falls, Baltimore County, Maryland

Newton Upper Falls, Massachusetts in Middlesex County

United Kingdom
Upper Falls, Northern Ireland